Pelly is a former provincial electoral district for the Legislative Assembly of the province of Saskatchewan, Canada. Located in east-central Saskatchewan, it was centered on the village of Pelly. The riding was created before the 2nd Saskatchewan general election in 1908, and dissolved before the 23rd Saskatchewan general election in 1995. This constituency elected the first woman to the Saskatchewan legislature: Sarah Ramsland.

It is now part of the district of Canora-Pelly.

Members of the Legislative Assembly

Notes
1 Magnus Ramsland died as a result of the worldwide influenza pandemic of 1918. In the 1919 Pelly by-election, he was succeeded by his widow Sarah Ramsland, the first woman ever elected to the Legislative Assembly of Saskatchewan.

Election results

|-

 
|Provincial Rights
|Richard Serle Dundas
|align="right"|331
|align="right"|47.69%
|align="right"|–
|- bgcolor="white"
!align="left" colspan=3|Total
!align="right"|694
!align="right"|100.00%
!align="right"|

|-

 
|Conservative
|E.J. Johnson
|align="right"|680
|align="right"|49.82%
|align="right"|+2.13
|- bgcolor="white"
!align="left" colspan=3|Total
!align="right"|1,365
!align="right"|100.00%
!align="right"|

|-

 
|Conservative
|Reginald J.M. Parker
|align="right"|1,387
|align="right"|36.61%
|align="right"|-13.21
|- bgcolor="white"
!align="left" colspan=3|Total
!align="right"|3,789
!align="right"|100.00%
!align="right"|

|-

|Independent
|Walter William Whelan
|align="right"|1,434
|align="right"|45.71%
|align="right"|–
|- bgcolor="white"
!align="left" colspan=3|Total
!align="right"|3,137
!align="right"|100.00%
!align="right"|

|-

|Independent
|Harry W. Slipchenko
|align="right"|925
|align="right"|21.36%
|align="right"| –
|- bgcolor="white"
!align="left" colspan=3|Total
!align="right"|4,331
!align="right"|100.00%
!align="right"|

|-

|- bgcolor="white"
!align="left" colspan=3|Total
!align="right"|3,632
!align="right"|100.00%
!align="right"|

|-

|Independent
|John Kenneth Johnston
|align="right"|1,234
|align="right"|28.57%
|align="right"|-
|- bgcolor="white"
!align="left" colspan=3|Total
!align="right"|4,320
!align="right"|100.00%
!align="right"|

|-

|Farmer-Labour
|Andrew Danyleyko
|align="right"|1,639
|align="right"|19.59%
|align="right"|–
 
|Conservative
|Frederick G. Garvin
|align="right"|1,426
|align="right"|17.04%
|align="right"|-

|- bgcolor="white"
!align="left" colspan=3|Total
!align="right"|8,368
!align="right"|100.00%
!align="right"|

|-

 
|CCF
|Gertrude S. Telford
|align="right"|3,088
|align="right"|43.96%
|align="right"|+24.37
|- bgcolor="white"
!align="left" colspan=3|Total
!align="right"|7,024
!align="right"|100.00%
!align="right"|

|-
 
|style="width: 130px"|CCF
|Dan Daniels
|align="right"|3,273
|align="right"|51.37%
|align="right"|+7.41

|- bgcolor="white"
!align="left" colspan=3|Total
!align="right"|6,371
!align="right"|100.00%
!align="right"|

|-

 
|CCF
|Dan Daniels
|align="right"|2,476
|align="right"|33.27%
|align="right"|-18.10

|- bgcolor="white"
!align="left" colspan=3|Total
!align="right"|7,443
!align="right"|100.00%
!align="right"|

|-
 
|style="width: 130px"|CCF
|Arnold Feusi
|align="right"|3,286
|align="right"|49.90%
|align="right"|+16.63

|- bgcolor="white"
!align="left" colspan=3|Total
!align="right"|6,585
!align="right"|100.00%
!align="right"|

|-

 
|CCF
|Arnold Feusi
|align="right"|3,069
|align="right"|42.60%
|align="right"|-7.30

|- bgcolor="white"
!align="left" colspan=3|Total
!align="right"|7,205
!align="right"|100.00%
!align="right"|

|-

 
|CCF
|Peter J. Wlasichuk
|align="right"|2,921
|align="right"|41.93%
|align="right"|-0.67

 
|Prog. Conservative
|Gordon C. Peters
|align="right"|287
|align="right"|4.12%
|align="right"|-
|- bgcolor="white"
!align="left" colspan=3|Total
!align="right"|6,967
!align="right"|100.00%
!align="right"|

|-
 
|style="width: 130px"|CCF
|Leonard Larson
|align="right"|2,705
|align="right"|41.07%
|align="right"|-0.86

 
|Prog. Conservative
|Bohdan E. Lozinsky
|align="right"|1,212
|align="right"|18.40%
|align="right"|+14.28
|- bgcolor="white"
!align="left" colspan=3|Total
!align="right"|6,586
!align="right"|100.00%
!align="right"|

|-

 
|NDP
|Leonard Larson
|align="right"|2,753
|align="right"|47.84%
|align="right"|+6.77
|- bgcolor="white"
!align="left" colspan=3|Total
!align="right"|5,755
!align="right"|100.00%
!align="right"|

|-
 
|style="width: 130px"|NDP
|Leonard Larson
|align="right"|2,905
|align="right"|56.08%
|align="right"|+8.24

|- bgcolor="white"
!align="left" colspan=3|Total
!align="right"|5,180
!align="right"|100.00%
!align="right"|

|-
 
|style="width: 130px"|NDP
|Leonard Larson
|align="right"|3,511
|align="right"|50.26%
|align="right"|-5.82

 
|Progressive Conservative
|W.J. Ferniuk
|align="right"|1,150
|align="right"|16.46%
|align="right"|-

|Independent
|George G. Shlakoff
|align="right"|75
|align="right"|1.07%
|align="right"|-
|- bgcolor="white"
!align="left" colspan=3|Total
!align="right"|6,986
!align="right"|100.00%
!align="right"|

|-
 
|style="width: 130px"|NDP
|Norm Lusney
|align="right"|3,724
|align="right"|48.29%
|align="right"|-1.97
 
|Progressive Conservative
|Barrie Johnson
|align="right"|2,314
|align="right"|30.00%
|align="right"|+13.54

|- bgcolor="white"
!align="left" colspan=3|Total
!align="right"|7,712
!align="right"|100.00%
!align="right"|

|-
 
|style="width: 130px"|NDP
|Norm Lusney
|align="right"|3,739
|align="right"|56.40%
|align="right"|+8.11
 
|Progressive Conservative
|Donald F. Boyd
|align="right"|2,130
|align="right"|32.13%
|align="right"|+2.13

|- bgcolor="white"
!align="left" colspan=3|Total
!align="right"|6,629
!align="right"|100.00%
!align="right"|

|-
 
|style="width: 130px"|NDP
|Norm Lusney
|align="right"|3,381
|align="right"|48.05%
|align="right"|-8.35
 
|Progressive Conservative
|Mervyn C. Abrahamson
|align="right"|3,179
|align="right"|45.18%
|align="right"|+13.05

|- bgcolor="white"
!align="left" colspan=3|Total
!align="right"|7,036
!align="right"|100.00%
!align="right"|

|-
 
|style="width: 130px"|Progressive Conservative
|Rod Gardner
|align="right"|3,280
|align="right"|49.47%
|align="right"|+4.29
 
|NDP
|Norm Lusney
|align="right"|3,113
|align="right"|46.95%
|align="right"|-1.10

|- bgcolor="white"
!align="left" colspan=3|Total
!align="right"|6,630
!align="right"|100.00%
!align="right"|

|-
 
|style="width: 130px"|NDP
|Ron Harper
|align="right"|3,992
|align="right"|59.59%
|align="right"|+12.64
 
|Progressive Conservative
|Bernard Rink
|align="right"|2,055
|align="right"|30.68%
|align="right"|-18.79

|- bgcolor="white"
!align="left" colspan=3|Total
!align="right"|6,699
!align="right"|100.00%
!align="right"|

See also 
Electoral district (Canada)
List of Saskatchewan provincial electoral districts
List of Saskatchewan general elections
List of political parties in Saskatchewan
Pelly, Saskatchewan

References 
 Saskatchewan Archives Board – Saskatchewan Election Results By Electoral Division

Former provincial electoral districts of Saskatchewan